Johannes Christian "Hans" Pflügler (born 27 March 1960) is a German former professional footballer. He could operate as either a left-back or a central defender, and played solely for Bayern Munich, winning ten major titles and appearing in nearly 400 official games.

Pflügler represented West Germany at the 1990 World Cup and Euro 1988, winning the former tournament.

Club career
Born in Freising, Pflügler made his professional debut in 1981–82 with the only club he ever knew, local FC Bayern Munich. After two experimental seasons he became first-choice, scoring a total of 27 Bundesliga goals from 1983 to 1988 and playing all the matches and minutes in the 1986–87 European Cup, as the team finally finished second to FC Porto.

After helping the Bavarians to five leagues and three cups, Pflügler only managed to make 14 appearances in the 1991–92 campaign, and decided to retire. However, a flood of injuries to the side in 1995 prompted a request by manager Giovanni Trapattoni which the player accepted, appearing on 8 April in a home game against 1. FC Kaiserslautern where he was also booked; even more astonishingly, he spent the entire 2001–02 with the B team in Regionalliga Süd, helping them to a final tenth place at the age of 42.

International career
Pflügler earned 11 caps for the Germany national team, making his debut on 25 March 1987 in a friendly with Israel. He was selected for the squad at the following year's UEFA European Championship.

Pflügler was also picked for the 1990 FIFA World Cup as Andreas Brehme's backup, playing 90 minutes of the 1–1 group-stage draw against Colombia for the eventual champions.

Personal life
Pflügler is an engineer with a diploma. He was also connected with Bayern's merchandising departments, where he already worked before being summoned out of retirement for the first time.

Pflügler also operated Pension Pflügler, in his hometown.

Honours
Bayern Munich
Bundesliga: 1984–85, 1985–86, 1986–87, 1988–89, 1989–90
DFB-Pokal: 1981–82, 1983–84, 1985–86; runner-up 1984–85
European Cup runner-up: 1986–87
DFL-Supercup: 1987, 1990

Germany
FIFA World Cup: 1990

See also
List of one-club men

References

External links

Pension Pflügler official website

1960 births
Living people
People from Freising
Sportspeople from Upper Bavaria
West German footballers
German footballers
Footballers from Bavaria
Association football defenders
Bundesliga players
FC Bayern Munich footballers
FC Bayern Munich II players
Germany international footballers
UEFA Euro 1988 players
1990 FIFA World Cup players
FIFA World Cup-winning players
FC Bayern Munich non-playing staff